To be distinguished from Diego López de Zúñiga (theologian) (d.1531)
Diego de Zúñiga of Salamanca (sometimes Latinized as Didacus a Stunica) (1536–1597) was an Augustinian Hermit and academic. He is known for publishing an early acceptance of the Copernican theory.

Life
A student of Luis de León, he taught at the University of Osuna and the University of Salamanca.

His In Job commentaria (Commentary on Job, 1584) addressed Job 9:6, in such a way as to assert that the Copernican heliocentric theory was an acceptable interpretation of Scripture. This publication made him one of a very small number of Catholic scholars of the sixteenth century who set out an explicit accommodation with the ideas of Copernicus. He did, however, subsequently change his views, on another front, philosophical rather than theological. In Philosophia prima pars, written at the end of his life, he rejected Copernicanism as incompatible with Aristotelian theory on natural philosophy.

The Philosophia prima pars was a large-scale work on metaphysics, structured in accordance with current university practice, and aimed at a reform in the university teaching of philosophy. Written from an Aristotelian point of view, it aimed to fortify the Peripatetic philosophy, fending off sceptics and arguing for it as scientific. Against the sceptical attack, truth was treated under metaphysics.

The work of Zúñiga was placed on the Church's Index, together with Copernicus' De revolutionibus, by a decree of the Sacred Congregation from March 5, 1616:

Notes

Works
 Philosophiae prima pars, qua perfecte et eleganter quatuor scientiae Metaphysica, Dialectica, Rhetorica et Physica declarantur Toledo: 1597.
Partial Spanish translation: Metafísica (1597) - Introducción, traducción y notas de Gerardo Bolado - Pamplona, Eunsa 2008.
Física (1597) - Introducción, traducción y notas de Gerardo Bolado - Pamplona, Eunsa 2009.

Further reading
 Rafael Chabrán, Diego de Zuñiga, Job and The Reception of Copernicus in Spain, Ometeca. Vol. 1 No. 2 & Vol. 2 No. 1 (1989–1990): pp. 61–68.
 Victor Navarro Brotons, The Reception of Copernicus in Sixteenth-Century Spain: The Case of Diego de Zuniga, Isis, Vol. 86, No. 1 (Mar., 1995), pp. 52–78

External links
The Birth of Ontology. A selection of Ontologists from 1560 to 1770

Augustinian friars
Spanish philosophers
16th-century Spanish Roman Catholic theologians
1536 births
1597 deaths
University of Salamanca alumni
16th-century Spanish philosophers